Ken Bourke (born 13 November 1958) is a former professional rugby league footballer who played first-grade for the Western Suburbs Magpies.

References

1958 births
Living people
Australian rugby league players
Rugby league players from New South Wales
Rugby league wingers
Western Suburbs Magpies players
Place of birth missing (living people)